The Northern Ireland national under-17 football team also known as Northern Ireland under-17s or Northern Ireland U17s represents Northern Ireland in association football at under-17 level. It is controlled by the Irish Football Association. The team first competed as Northern Ireland under-16 before evolving into the current under-17 side when UEFA realigned their youth tournaments in 2001. They have qualified for the finals of the UEFA European Under-16 Championships five times (1987, 1990, 1992, 1993 and 1997) and for the UEFA European Under-17 Football Championship once (2004). In addition to the UEFA Championships, the team also plays regular friendlies and in minor tournaments from similar age-group teams from throughout the world.

Competitive record

UEFA U-16/17 European Championship record

FIFA Under-17 World Cup

Current Coaching Staff

Players

Current squad
Players born on or after 1 January 2006 will be eligible until the end of the 2023 UEFA European Under-17 Championship. Names in bold denote players who have been capped by Northern Ireland in a higher age group.

Recent call-ups
The following players have previously been called up to the Northern Ireland under-17 squad and remain eligible.

See also
 Northern Ireland national football team
 Northern Ireland national under-21 football team
 Northern Ireland national under-19 football team

References

External links
 Fixtures & Results
 Current squad
 UEFA U17 Championship Record

Under 17s
European national under-17 association football teams
Youth association football in Northern Ireland